Troglaegopis is a monotypic genus of gastropods belonging to the family Zonitidae. The only species is Troglaegopis mosorensis.

The species is found in Europe.

References

Zonitidae